The position of United States Ambassador to Australia has existed since 1940. U.S.–Australian relations have been close throughout the history of Australia. Before World War II, Australia was closely aligned with the United Kingdom, but it has strengthened its relationship with the United States since 1942, as Britain's influence in Asia has declined and the United States' influence has increased. At the governmental level, United States–Australia relationships are formalised by the ANZUS treaty and Australia-United States Free Trade Agreement.

The embassy in Canberra has long been regarded as a desirable posting and hence has become a patronage position. U.S. Ambassadors to Australia have traditionally been friends, political allies, or former business associates of the current President. Some have been major donors to the President's election campaign or political party. Few have been career diplomats (Marshall Green was a conspicuous exception). The two ambassadors during the Bush Administration, for example, were Tom Schieffer, a former business associate of President Bush, and Robert McCallum Jr., a Bush college friend. In 1942, President Franklin Delano Roosevelt's close associate and nominee to be US Minister in Canberra, Edward J. Flynn, was forced to withdraw his nomination for the position following difficulties in the senate confirmation process. The actor Fess Parker was offered the post in 1985 by Ronald Reagan, after representing Reagan at an event in Australia. Parker considered it, but turned it down.

This arrangement has suited Australian governments, which welcome the ability of such Ambassadors to gain direct access to the President, bypassing the State Department. However, this has often had the result of long periods without an appointed ambassador and additional delays in the Senate confirmation process, with the career diplomat deputy head of mission serving as Chargé d’Affaires ad interim, such as between February 2005 and August 2006, from September 2016 to February 2019 and from January 2021 to July 2022.

United States Ambassadors to Australia
The following individuals have served as the US Ambassadors to Australia, or any precedent titles:

See also

 Australia–United States relations
 Ambassadors of the United States
 Embassy of the United States, Canberra
 Embassy of Australia, Washington, D.C.
 Ambassadors of Australia to the United States
 Consuls-General of Australia in New York

References

United States Department of State: Background notes on Australia

External links
 
 United States Department of State: Chiefs of Mission for Australia
 United States Department of State: Australia

Australia
 
United States